Kenny Temitope Temilade Coker (born 10 November 2003) is an American professional soccer player who plays as a striker for Premier League club Norwich City.

Career

Southend United 
On 1 February 2020, after previously appearing in the youth systems at Bowers & Pitsea and Billericay Town, Coker made his debut for Southend United in a 2–1 victory over Lincoln City in League One. At 16 years and 83 days he was the third youngest player to ever play for Southend United.

Norwich City 
In May 2021, it was announced that Coker had agreed to join Norwich City, following a trial with the club. He made his debut for the club's under-18 side in a 3–0 loss to Fulham that month.

On 19 July 2021, Coker signed his first professional contract with the Canaries.

Personal life
Coker was born in Atlanta, Georgia to an English mother and Nigerian father.

Career statistics

References

2003 births
Living people
Sportspeople from Atlanta
American soccer players
English footballers
American sportspeople of Nigerian descent
American people of English descent
English sportspeople of Nigerian descent
Association football forwards
Black British sportspeople
English Football League players
Southend United F.C. players
Norwich City F.C. players